Parole! is a 1936 American crime film directed by Lew Landers and written by Kubec Glasmon and Horace McCoy. The film stars Henry Hunter, Ann Preston, Alan Dinehart, Alan Baxter, Alan Hale Sr. and Grant Mitchell. The film was released on June 14, 1936, by Universal Pictures.

Plot

Cast       
Henry Hunter as Russ Whalen
Ann Preston as Frances Crawford
Alan Dinehart as Richard Mallard
Alan Baxter as Percy 'Okay' Smith
Alan Hale Sr. as John Borchard
Grant Mitchell as Marty Crawford
Berton Churchill as Rex Gavin
Noah Beery Jr. as Bobby Freeman
Bernadene Hayes as Joyce Daniels
Wallis Clark as Prison Warden
John Miltern as Governor Slade
Charles Richman as John 'Jack' Driscoll
Frank Mills as Dummy Watts
Selmer Jackson as Earl Bigbee
Phillip Trent as Gregory 
Anthony Quinn as Zingo Browning

References

External links
 

1936 films
American crime films
1936 crime films
Universal Pictures films
Films directed by Lew Landers
American black-and-white films
Films with screenplays by Kubec Glasmon
1930s English-language films
1930s American films